The Pârâul Urșanilor is a left tributary of the river Luncavăț in Romania. It flows into the Luncavăț in Horezu.

References

Rivers of Romania
Rivers of Vâlcea County